The 2020–21 season is the 82nd season in the existence of Moreirense F.C. and the club's 7th consecutive season in the top-flight of Portuguese football. In addition to the domestic league, Moreirense participated in this season's editions of the Taça de Portugal and Taça da Liga.

Players

First-team squad

Out on loan

Transfers

In

Out

Pre-season and friendlies

Competitions

Overview

Primeira Liga

League table

Results summary

Results by round

Matches
The league fixtures were announced on 28 August 2020.

Taça da Liga

Notes

References

Moreirense F.C. seasons
Moreirense